Waldo Quiroz (born 10 September 1949) is a Chilean footballer. He played in five matches for the Chile national football team from 1977 to 1979. He was also part of Chile's squad for the 1979 Copa América tournament.

References

External links
 

1949 births
Living people
Chilean footballers
Chile international footballers
Association football midfielders
Footballers from Santiago